Thiruvarur Junction (station code: TVR) is a junction railway station serving Thiruvarur town, headquarters of Thiruvarur district in Tamil Nadu in India and a focal point on the branch line connecting trains from Chennai to Nagapattinam–Velankanni–Nagore–Karaikal on one line and Karaikkudi–Sivganga–Manamadurai–Rameswaram on the second line and Tiruchirappalli–Thanjavur–Thiruvarur–Nagapattinam–Karaikal on the third line and Mayiladuthurai–Thiruvarur on the fourth line that branches out of the station.

The station is a part of the Trichy railway division one of the 6 divisions of the Southern Railway zone. It is also officially known by its code:TVR.

History 
In 1861, the Great Southern of India Railway (GSIR) built the 125 km (78 mi)-long -wide line between Nagapattinam and Tiruchirappali (then known as Trichinopoly) via Thiruvarur, Thanjavur and the line was opened to traffic next year. It was a new development south of Chennai. After taking over GSIR by South Indian Railway Company in 1874, the Nagapattinam–Tiruchirappalli line was converted to 1,000 mm (3 ft 3 3/8 in)-wide metre gauge in 1875.

Location and layout

The Thiruvarur Junction is situated on the Panagal Road which is sandwiched between the Netaji Road and the Coimbatore–Nagapattinam National Highway 83, the two arterial thoroughfares of the towm.

On the Panagal Road is also located the Thiruvarur Bus Depot where buses to Nagapattinam, Velankanni, Karaikal, Mayiladuthurai, Adirampatinam, Mannarkudi, Thanjavur, Kumbakonam and several nearby destinations are available.

The nearest airport is the Tiruchirappalli International Airport some 105 km away from the station. The next nearest train stations are Mankudi (south), Kulikarai (west), Adiyakkamangalam (east) and Vijayapuram (north).

The station has 5 platforms and over 7 tracks in broad gauge.

The station is converted into electrified. (Current processing)

Lines

There are 4 lines that branch out of the station:

 BG single line (branch of the main line) towards Chennai via Villupuram Jn, Mayiladuthurai Jn.
 BG single line to Velankanni, Nagapattinam Jn, Nagore and Karaikal.
 BG single line to Tiruchirapalli Jn via Thanjavur Jn and Nidamangalam Jn.
 BG single line to KaraikudiJn via Thiruthuraipoondi Jn, Thiruvarur. Gauge conversion completed between Thiruvarur Jn and Karaikudi Jn is in progress and there is only partial connectivity in the segment connecting Pattukottai and Karaikudi Jn. Speed test between Pattukottai to Thiruvarur Jn in via Thiruthuraipoondi Jn in new BG line speed up to 120 km/h.
Thiruvarur to Karaikkudi via Thiruthuraipoondi Passenger train starts 1 June 2019

Electrification 
New electrification survey in 2012–13 had been sanctioned in the Railway Budget for the Karaikal/Karaikal port–Thiruvarur Jn–Thanjavur–Tiruchirappalli and Nagapattinam–Velankanni sectors.

Gauge conversion 
After conversion work of the Thanjavur–Thiruvarur broad-gauge section was opened to traffic in 2006 and Thiruvarur–Nagapattinam–Nagore section in 2010.
Gauge conversion between Thiruvarur Junction railway station and Karaikudi Junction railway station is completed in progress and there is only partial connectivity in the segment connecting Pattukottai, Thiruthuraupoondi Junction railway station and Karaikudi Junction.

Services 
The station is directly connected to the state capital, Chennai by Kamban Express and Mannai Express travelling via Mayiladuthurai Jn, Villupuram Jn, Chengalpattu Jn.

Tea Garden Express connecting Thiruvarur to various Central Districts of Tamil Nadu (Karur Jn, Erode Jn, Tirupur, Coimbatore Jn) and Districts of Kerala are Palakkad,Thrissur,Ernakulam 

There are three Weekly Expresses operating in Thiruvarur Jn. They are

Velankanni–Vasco-Da-Gama Weekly Express via Nagapattinam, Thiruvarur, Tiruchirappalli, Salem, Yesvantpur, Hubballi, Castle Rock, Madgaon.
Lokmanya Tilak Terminus (Mumbai)–Karaikal Express (LHB Rake) Weekly Express via Nagapattinam, Thiruvarur, Mayiladuthurai, Villupuram, Chennai, Pune, Thane.
Mannargudi–Tirupathi Tri-Weekly Pamani Express operating via Nidamangalam, Thiruvarur, Mayiladuthurai, Cuddalore, Villupuram, Katpadi, Chittoor.

There are passenger trains calling at all stations operating from Thiruvarur connecting near and farther towns such as Nagapattinam, Karaikal, Nagore, Velankanni, Nidamangalam, Peralam, Mannargudi, Thanjavur, Tiruchirappalli, Mayiladuthurai, Chinna Salem, KSR Bengaluru, Cuddalore, Villupuram, Thiruthuraipoondi, Pattukottai, Muthupet, Peravurani and Karaikudi.

Gallery

References

External links
 Indian Railways

Trichy railway division
Railway stations in Thiruvarur district
Railway junction stations in Tamil Nadu